Pawan Kumar Singh is an Indian politician from West Bengal. He is the son of Arjun Singh of Barrackpore and a Member of the West Bengal Legislative Assembly from Bhatpara. The seat became vacant due to the resignation of sitting MLA Arjun Singh. In the by-election, Pawan Singh won the seat on the BJP ticket defeating former transport minister of West Bengal Madan Mitra.

Constituency
He Represents Bhatpara (Vidhan Sabha constituency).

Political Party
He is from Bharatiya Janata Party.

References

Living people
Bharatiya Janata Party politicians from West Bengal
West Bengal MLAs 2016–2021
West Bengal MLAs 2021–2026
1990 births